The 2016 Priceline Pharmacy Classic took place between 12 and 15 January at the Kooyong Stadium in Melbourne, Australia.

Seeds

Draw

Main bracket

Lower bracket

Play-offs

Kooyong Classic
AAMI Classic